Jens Jäger (born  in Rottweil) is a German wheelchair curler.

He participated in the 2010 Winter Paralympics where German wheelchair curling team finished on eighth place.

Teams

References

External links 

Profile at the Official Website for the 2010 Winter Paralympics in Vancouver

Living people
1963 births
People from Rottweil
Sportspeople from Freiburg (region)
German male curlers
German disabled sportspeople
German wheelchair curlers
Paralympic wheelchair curlers of Germany
Wheelchair curlers at the 2010 Winter Paralympics